Tredyffrin/Easttown School District (T/E in short) is a school district based in Tredyffrin Township, Chester County, Pennsylvania.

T/E School District serves the townships of Tredyffrin Township and Easttown Township, and is one of the several school districts serving the Philadelphia Main Line. T/E serves all or portions of several communities wholly or partly in the two townships, including Berwyn, Malvern, Chesterbrook, Daylesford, Devon, Paoli, Strafford,  Wayne, and Radnor.  In the 2010-2011 school year, the school district had 6,323 enrolled students.  In 2008, Philadelphia magazine ranked the school district the best in the Philadelphia area.

Administration
Tredyffrin/Easttown School District Administrators:

Dr. Richard Gusick
Superintendent of Schools

Schools

There is one high school, two middle schools, and five elementary schools in the Tredyffrin/Easttown School District.

High school
1 in Tredyffrin Township
 Conestoga High School (CHS, Tredyffrin Township, Berwyn address)

Middle schools
2 in Tredyffrin Township
 Tredyffrin/Easttown Middle School (TEMS, Tredyffrin Township, Berwyn address)
 Valley Forge Middle School (VFMS, Tredyffrin Township, Wayne address)

Elementary schools
2 in Easttown Township, 3 in Tredyffrin Township
 Beaumont Elementary School (BES, Easttown Township, Berwyn address)
 Devon Elementary School (DES, Easttown Township, Devon address)
 Hillside Elementary School (HES, Tredyffrin Township, Berwyn address)
 New Eagle Elementary School (NEES, Tredyffrin Township, Wayne address)
 Valley Forge Elementary School (VFES, Tredyffrin Township, Wayne address)

Devon Elementary School and New Eagle Elementary School are National Blue Ribbon Schools.

See also
List of school districts in Pennsylvania

References

Tredyffrin/Easttown School District

External links
 Tredyffrin/Easttown School District

School districts in Chester County, Pennsylvania
School districts established in 1909